Wetheral is a railway station on the Tyne Valley Line, which runs between  and  via . It is owned by Network Rail and managed by Northern Trains.

History
The Newcastle and Carlisle Railway was formed in 1829, and was opened in stages. The station was opened in July 1836, following the opening of the Newcastle and Carlisle Railway between Greenhead and Carlisle London Road.

Corby Bridge (also known as Wetheral Viaduct) is situated to the east of the station, over which trains pass when travelling towards Newcastle. Construction of the -long bridge began in 1830, and was completed in 1834. It also carries a cast iron footbridge that links the station with the nearby village of Great Corby, which was added in 1851.

The station was originally staffed, and the old stationmaster's house still stands as a private residence. Following the Beeching Axe, the station was closed in January 1967, along with the neighbouring station at Heads Nook. 

Wetheral was formally re-opened by British Rail on 5 October 1981. The reopening followed the construction of new housing estate and lobbying by the local parish council. Although the original platforms were still in situ, the station building had to be made safe and refurbished for passengers. The works were funded by Cumbria County Council which also sponsored a scheme by Manpower Services Commission to complete the work in time for reopening.

Facilities
The station has two platforms, both of which have a ticket machine (which accepts card or contactless payment only), seating, waiting shelter, next train audio and visual displays and an emergency help point. There is step-free access to both platforms, with both platforms also being linked by a pre-grouping metal footbridge, similar to those at Brampton (Cumbria) and Haltwhistle. There is a small car park at the station.

Wetheral is part of the Northern Trains penalty fare network, meaning that a valid ticket or promise to pay notice is required prior to boarding the train.

Services

On Sunday, there are nine trains heading towards Carlisle, and eight trains heading towards Newcastle via Hexham. All services are operated by Northern Trains.

Rolling stock used: Class 156 Super Sprinter and Class 158 Express Sprinter

References

External links 

 

Railway stations in Cumbria
DfT Category F2 stations
Former North Eastern Railway (UK) stations
Railway stations in Great Britain opened in 1836
Railway stations in Great Britain closed in 1967
Railway stations in Great Britain opened in 1981
Reopened railway stations in Great Britain
Northern franchise railway stations
Beeching closures in England
Wetheral